The Institution of Mining and Metallurgy (IMM) was a British research institution, founded in 1892. Members of the Institution used the post-nominals MIMM.

In 2002, it merged with The Institute of Materials (IOM) to form the Institute of Materials, Minerals and Mining (IOM3 or IMMM)

References

Mining organizations
Mining in the United Kingdom
Defunct professional associations based in the United Kingdom
Geology organizations
1892 establishments in the United Kingdom

External links 
 Obituaries of Members 1892-1968 Northern Mine Research Society